Prototheca zopfii is aerobic, unicellular, yeast-like, achlorophyllic (without chlorophyll) microalga.

Distribution 

Prototheca zopfii is opportunistic, environmental pathogen and ubiquitous in nature. This alga is mainly associated with wet areas and places with high organic contents. It can be found in tanks, well water, teat-dip containers, and milking machines.

Genome

The genome of this organism's mitochondrion and plastid were first sequenced in 2018.

Reproduction 

Prototheca zopfii reproduce asexually by endosporulation.

Culture media 

Sabouraud agar is used as a cultural medium.

Differential diagnosis 

Polymerase chain reaction and restriction fragment length polymorphism analysis are useful tool for rapid confirmative diagnosis.

Pathogenicity 

The species can infect man and animal, causing mastitis. P. zopfii can cause bovine clinical mastitis in high milk-yielding cows. Genotypes I and III, traditionally, are thought not to be involved in the pathogenicity of mastitis and to be pollutants of milk, whereas genotype II is believed the main cause of mastitis. However, in 2017, three cases of human protothecosis due to P. zopfii genotype I have been reported in China.

Outbreaks 

Bovine mastitis outbreaks by P. zopfii is a global problem. It is reported from Europe, Asia, North America, and South America.

Antimicrobial therapy 

Prototheca zopfii is less susceptible or completely resistant to clotrimazole, fluconazole, econazole, flucytosine, cefoperazone, cephalexin, enrofloxacin, lincomycin, oxytetracycline, miconazole, colistin, a combination of amoxicillin with clavulanic acid, enrofloxacin, amoxicillin, tetracycline, penicillin, lincomycin, and novobiocin, whereas drugs such as nystatin, ketoconazole, and amphotericin B are effective against algae isolated from milk of mastitis-affected cows.

References 

Chlorellaceae